Varsity Sports SA, is a group university sports leagues in South Africa. Its members all belong to the University Sport Company, and may each enter only one campus per competition, though they may enter different campuses for different competitions.

History
The Varsity Cup tournament was founded in 2008, featuring the rugby teams of eight universities. Varsity Sports was created as an offshoot in 2012. In the first season rugby sevens and beach volleyball were played. In 2013, athletics, field hockey, association football and netball were added. In 2016, mountain biking was added.

Member universities

Sports
Varsity Sports currently runs competitions in six sporting codes. These are athletics, beach volleyball, association football, field hockey, netball and rugby sevens. Athletics and football have events for both men and women. Rugby, has only a men's event. Volleyball, netball and hockey have only female events, though men's hockey will be added in 2014.

List of Varsity sports

Season summaries

2012
In 2012, the only events held were for rugby sevens and beach volleyball.

Ten teams took part in sevens rugby. They were, UFS, NMMU, UCT, TUT, UP-Tuks, UWC, NWU-Pukke, Limpopo, Maties and UJ. The University of Stellenbosh won the first rugby sevens title. They won both of the tournaments, held in Plettenberg Bay and Margate.

Seven teams took part in beach volleyball. They were UWC, UJ, UP-Tuks, UCT, Limpopo, NMMU and TUT.  The University of the Western Cape won the tournament. The Plettenbrg Bay event was called off before the final, due to bad weather.

2013
In 2013, the season began with a three meeting athletics series. The overall winner was UP-Tuks.

That was followed by a women's field hockey tournament, which was won by Maties.

The 2013 Varsity Football tournament was won by UP-Tuks.

The netball competition was won by UFS-Kovsies.

The 2013 rugby sevens and volleyball tournaments were won by defending champions Maties and UWC respectively.

2014
The 2014  saw a four meeting athletics series, and a men's hockey tournament replacing the women's one from 2013.

The 2014 Varsity Football season will begin in July, and will be followed by netball, rugby sevens and beach volleyball.

2019

The inaugural Varsity Women’s Rugby 7s,   Basketball.

2020
Cancelled due to the COVID-19 pandemic, football could restart.

2021

This tournaments, football and netball, will take place in a secure Covid-19 bio-bubble called the Varsity Sport Village, matches will be played at University of Pretoria and Stellenbosch University.

See also 
 Varsity Football (South Africa)
 Varsity Rugby

References

 
2012 establishments in South Africa